The canton of Le Sud Grésivaudan is an administrative division of the Isère department, eastern France. It was created at the French canton reorganisation which came into effect in March 2015. Its seat is in Saint-Marcellin.

It consists of the following communes:
 
L'Albenc
Auberives-en-Royans
Beaulieu
Beauvoir-en-Royans
Bessins
Chantesse
Chasselay
Châtelus
Chatte
Chevrières
Choranche
Cognin-les-Gorges
Cras
Izeron
Malleval-en-Vercors
Montagne
Morette
Murinais
Notre-Dame-de-l'Osier
Pont-en-Royans
Presles
Quincieu
Rencurel
La Rivière
Rovon
Saint-André-en-Royans
Saint-Antoine-l'Abbaye
Saint-Appolinard
Saint-Bonnet-de-Chavagne
Saint-Gervais
Saint-Hilaire-du-Rosier
Saint-Just-de-Claix
Saint-Lattier
Saint-Marcellin
Saint-Pierre-de-Chérennes
Saint-Romans
Saint-Sauveur
Saint-Vérand
Serre-Nerpol
La Sône
Têche
Varacieux
Vatilieu
Vinay

References

Cantons of Isère